Simbang Gabi (Filipino for "Night Mass") is a devotional, nine-day series of Masses attended by Filipino Catholics in anticipation of Christmas. It is similar to the nine dawn Masses leading to Christmas Eve practiced in Puerto Rico called Misa de Aguinaldo.

Simbang Gabi in the Philippines is held daily from December 16 to 24, and occur at different times ranging from as early as 3:00 a.m. to 5:00 a.m. local time. On the last day of the Simbang Gabi, which is Christmas Eve, the service is instead called Misa de Gallo (Spanish for "Rooster's Mass"). It has an important role in Philippine culture.

History
Simbang Gabi originated in the early days of Spanish rule over the Philippines as a practical compromise for farmers, who began work before sunrise to avoid the noonday heat out in the fields. It began in 1669. Priests began to hold Mass in the early mornings for the Farmers instead of the evening novenas more common in the rest of the Hispanic world. This cherished Christmas custom eventually became a distinct feature of Philippine culture and became a symbol of sharing.

Spanish Era agricultural practices
The Philippines is an agricultural country known for its rice, coconut and sugarcane plantations. Many tenant farmers (also known as sacadas, campesinos, and casamacs) toiled all day with one break during noon when the heat would be at its peak. Losing an hour due to the unbearable temperatures, farmers worked hard and budgeted their time out of fear of the local encargado who administered land for the Spanish feudal lord or hacendero .

In between the planting and harvest seasons is a lull in the corvée imposed on natives. Those who were old enough to provide manual labor were gathered under the tributo system where men would have to work for free for the Spanish colonial government's building projects. The women also had their share of work tending to their vegetable gardens (tumana) and as household staff for the elite.

When the Christmas season would begin, it was customary to hold novenas in the evenings, but the priests saw that the people would attend despite the day's fatigue. As a compromise, the clergy began to say Masses in the early morning while it was still dark before people went out to work the land.

Cuisine

During the Spanish Era and early American Period, the parishioners would mostly have nothing to offer during Mass except sacks of rice, fruits and vegetables, and fresh eggs. The Church would share the produce with the congregation after the service.

After Mass, Filipinos buy and eat holiday delicacies sold in the churchyard for breakfast. Bibingka (rice cakes cooked above and below) and puto bumbong (steamed purple rice pastries, seasoned with butter, grated coconut, and brown sugar) are popular, often paired with tsokolate (hot chocolate from local cacao) or salabát (ginger tea).

Today, local delicacies are readily available in the church's premises for the parishioners. The iconic puto bumbóng, bibingka, suman and other rice pastries are cooked on the spot. Latík and yema are sweets sold to children, while biscuits like uraró (arrowroot), barquillos, lengua de gato and otap (ladyfingers) are also available. Kapeng barako (a very strong coffee grown in the province of Batangas), hot tsokolate, or salabat are the main drinks, while soups such as arróz caldo (rice and chicken porridge) and papait (goat bile stew from the Ilocos region) are also found.

The rice-based foods were traditionally served to fill the stomachs of the farmers, since rice is a cheap and primary staple. The pastries were full of carbohydrates needed by colonial Filipinos for the work they undertook in the rice paddies and sugar mills.

Current practices

The Mass usually begins at four o’clock in the morning. Pope Sixtus V ordered that Mass must be heard before sunrise since it was the harvest season, and farmers needed to be in the fields right after the liturgy.

White is the liturgical color authorized solely for Masses celebrated within the context of the novena; violet is used for any other Masses said during the day, as these are still considered part of the Advent season. With regards to Sunday Celebration of Simbang Gabi, the Propers (Collect, Prayer over the Gifts and Post-Communion Prayers) together with readings are taken from the Sunday Liturgy and the liturgical color is Violet since Sunday is Advent Liturgy.

Filipinos celebrate this Mass with great solemnity and the Gloria is sung (which is otherwise forbidden the rest of the day). Simbang Gabi is also celebrated in malls, usually in open spaces. Cardinal Luis Antonio Tagle discouraged the celebration of Mass in malls, except when a mall has its own chapel.

Evening celebrations of the Simbang Gabi are also held from December 15 until 23. Erroneously described as "anticipated Simbang Gabi" since Vigil or Anticipated Masses are only applicable for Sundays and Holy Days of Obligation, these are done especially in urban areas. However, the propers and readings used for these Masses are those which are prescribed for the day. Although practiced in some parishes, "Anticipation" of the propers and readings prescribed for the next day is prohibited.

A well-known folk belief is that if a devotee completes all nine days of the Simbang Gabi, God may grant a request made as part of the novena.

Similar to the Spanish tradition of lighting small oil lamps on Christmas Eve, Filipinos adorn their homes with paról, which are colourful star-shaped lanterns. These are believed to have originally been used by worshippers to light their way to church in the early morning, as well as to symbolise the Star of Bethlehem. Paróls continue to be popular yuletide decorations in the Philippines, as iconic and emblematic as Christmas trees are in the West.

To give the faithful a chance to experience how Simbang Gabi was celebrated during the Spanish Era, groups which celebrate the Traditional Latin Mass also have the Simbang Gabi in candlelight, using locally composed, centuries-old settings for the Propers and Ordinaries of the Mass.

See also
 Christmas in the Philippines
 Rorate Coeli

References

External links
Simbang Gabi at the Roman Catholic Archdiocese of Manila

Catholic devotions
Christmas in the Philippines
Mass in the Catholic Church
Tagalog words and phrases